Guntur–Amaravathi Road is a major arterial road in the Indian city of Guntur. The road starts at Brodipet on Guntur and stretches towards Amaravathi. Government of Andhra Pradesh proposed to make it as State Highway.

Guntur to Amaravathi Road will be Four Lane Shortly. Andhra Pradesh government is all geared up to widen the narrow single lane road between Tadikonda and Thullur to a four lane highway.

References 

Roads in Guntur